The IPW United States Heavyweight Championship was the top title in the American independent wrestling promotion Innovate Pro Wrestling.  On August 19, 2017 at ReGenesis; promoter Tony Givens announced that NWA Smoky Mountain was leaving the National Wrestling Alliance and their name was changing to Innovate Wrestling.  Toby Farley who was the reigning NWA Mountain Empire Champion defeated Tommy Lou Retton to become the interim IPW United States Heavyweight Champion with a pending match with Chase Owens upon his return.  Devin Driscoll became the official championship on October 21, 2017 at Shocktober in a Four-way match when he defeated Chase Owens, Farley, and Jeff Connelly.

On May 29, 2021, Toby Farley defeated Chris Richards for the IPW Television Championship.  Both titles were merged and the IPW Grand Championship was created.  Farley became the inaugural champion as a result.

Title history

Names

Reigns

|}

Combined reigns

Reference

Regional professional wrestling championships
United States professional wrestling championships
Professional wrestling in Tennessee